The 1982–83 NBA season was the Rockets' 16th season in the NBA and 12th season in the city of Houston.

Draft picks

Roster

Regular season

Season standings

z – clinched division title
y – clinched division title
x – clinched playoff spot

Record vs. opponents

Game log

Player statistics

Awards and records

Transactions

References

See also
1982–83 NBA season

Houston Rockets seasons
H